Augustana is an American rock band from San Diego, California that has released five albums and an EP while being signed to Epic Records and Razor & Tie. They are best known for their song "Boston" and the album All the Stars and Boulevards. They are fronted by Daniel Layus, who is the only remaining member of the band.

History

Early career
In Autumn 2002 at Greenville University in Illinois, Dan Layus brought friends Josiah Rosen, Kyle Baker, and Simeon Lohrmann together to write and create music. They began out by re-recording the song "More than a Love Song" which Dan had written for his high school girlfriend while living in California. They originally wanted to call themselves The Looking Glass, but after discovering another band of the same name they chose "Augustana" instead. A full-length debut album, Midwest Skies and Sleepless Mondays was recorded in the home recording studio of Jon King. The album was released in the Spring of 2003 and only 1000 copies were produced, however, early buzz and reviews were primarily positive. Later that year the band recorded and released 25 copies of the Mayfield EP.

Dan Layus decided to move back to Southern California with bandmate Josiah Rosen, where they eventually found their drummer, Justin South. The band joined numerous tours with artists such as Switchfoot, Maroon 5, The Fray, Counting Crows, Dashboard Confessional, O.A.R., Snow Patrol, The Damnwells, Goo Goo Dolls, Acceptance, Cartel, and OneRepublic, as well as having their own headlining tours.

All the Stars and Boulevards (2005–2007)
All the Stars and Boulevards was released September 6, 2005, and reached #1 on the Billboard Top Heatseekers chart and #96 on the Billboard Top 200 chart. The first single from the album, "Boston", was released in 2005. This version differs from the one on their debut album, Midwest Skies and Sleepless Mondays. The album was made available exclusively at Best Buy stores, and the Best Buy website, where it was sold out by the following day. The new features on this re-release are a re-mixed version of "Wasteland"; a new track named "Marie"; and acoustic versions and music videos of "Boston" and "Stars and Boulevards". Their most recognizable song is "Boston" which made it all the way to 34 on the Billboard top 100, as well as appearing on television shows Scrubs, Smallville, Hidden Palms, and One Tree Hill. Leonard Hofstadter is heard singing it in the third episode of Season 1 of The Big Bang Theory. Josiah Rosen left the band soon after. At the beginning of 2007, the band embarked on their second headlining tour, supported by Vega4. The band also opened for Chris Carrabba of Dashboard Confessional in late 2007.

Can't Love, Can't Hurt (2008–2010)
The band released their third album, Can't Love, Can't Hurt, on April 29, 2008. The first single from the album is titled "Sweet and Low". The second single, "I Still Ain't Over You" reached #22 on the Adult album alternative chart. On May 1, 2008, the band appeared on The Tonight Show with Jay Leno. Following personnel problems, the band had to cancel their European/North American tour for fall 2010.

Augustana (2011–2013)
Augustana's self-titled, fourth full-length album was released on April 26, 2011. The album's lead single, "Steal Your Heart", was planned for a radio release on February 14 in order to coincide with Valentine's Day, but was released early on the 8th of February on AOL Music. Another song off the album "Just Stay Here Tonight" was used in an episode of Private Practice. "Steal Your Heart" was also used in the extended length Degrassi promo for the 11th season. They were featured on the Late Show with David Letterman and performed "Steal Your Heart".

Augustana parted ways with Epic Records shortly after the album's release and on 11 November 2011, Dan Layus announced that all remaining members had amicably parted ways, but that he would continue to tour and perform under the name Augustana. On 22 July 2013, Dan Layus announced that Augustana was signed to a new record deal.

Life Imitating Life, Side A, Solo work, Singles and Live (Recorded from a Livestream Event) (2014–2021)
In early 2014 the band announced that they had signed with Razor & Tie. On April 22, 2014, Augustana released the album, Life Imitating Life. They also premiered the first single, "Ash and Ember".

On September 2, 2015, Augustana released three new tracks ("Climb", "Must Be Love" and "You Can Have Mine") on an EP titled "Side A".

In 2016, they began touring as an opener for the Dixie Chicks on their DCX MMXVI World Tour.

On August 3, 2016, Augustana's social media sites changed their names to Dan Layus, the name of the sole remaining founding member and lead singer/songwriter.

Dan Layus released a solo album, Dangerous Things, on October 21, 2016. A new version of the Augustana track "You Can Have Mine" from the "Side A" EP was featured on Dangerous Things. In late 2017 and into 2018, Dan Layus referred to a follow up solo project tentatively titled, "Dangerous Times", on his Twitter account; however, as of 2021, the follow up project had not been publicly released.

On August 28, 2019, the song "For Now, Forever" was released as a digital single, with "The Heart of It" as its B-side, under the Augustana name. Augustana then embarked on a US tour in October 2019 into November 2019, with Zac Clark of Andrew McMahon in the Wilderness as a supporting act. On August 21, 2020, the songs "Okay" and "Lies" were released digitally, and on November 20, 2020, "Take" was released as another new digital single. Closing out the year, Augustana debuted a cover of "Make Someone Happy" from the musical Do Re Mi, on December 20, 2020.

The Live (Recorded from a Livestream Event) album was released on streaming platforms on March 19, 2021, with songs from a virtual concert that was held on December 3, 2020. On April 16, 2021, Layus announced the album would be pressed on a double vinyl and likely ship in April. On June 2, 2021, Layus announced an east coast solo tour to take place in November 2021. The tour continued in early 2022 with mid-west dates.

Everyday An Eternity, Yourself Yesterday: A Rarities Collection (2022–present) 
Layus digitally released the single "Remedy" on January 20, 2022, written and produced with David Naish.

On May 20, 2022, Augustana released a surprise digital album, titled Everyday an Eternity. Layus shared on his website and social media accounts, "Everyday an Eternity is an album of solo piano works written at times when I’ve felt pulled towards artistic expression through the piano alone, while weaving lyricism into the instrument itself." A vinyl pre-order was announced shortly after, on June 6.

Yourself Yesterday: A Rarities Collection, an album of rare and previously unreleased tracks, was digitally released on August 19, 2022. Layus said the tracks spanned from the past decade.

Band members
Last lineup
 Dan Layus (vocals, guitar, piano)

Former Members
Jared Palomar (bass guitar, vocals, keyboards)
Chris Sachtleben (lead guitar, vocals)
Justin South (drums)
Josiah Rosen (lead guitar, vocals)
John Vincent (piano, keyboards, vocals)
Josh Calhoun (drums)
Simeon Lohrmann (bass)
Kyle Baker (drums)

Discography

Studio albums

Live albums

Extended plays

Singles

In popular culture
In The Big Bang Theory television series, episode 3, series 1, "The Fuzzy Boots Corollary", first aired October 8, 2007, main character Leonard Hofstadter sings the song Boston.

References

External links
 

Rock music groups from California
Musical groups from San Diego
Greenville College people